Virgile Reset (born 3 August 1985) is a French football midfielder, who currently plays for Sporting Toulon Var.

Career
Reset began his career with Lorient and joined than in summer 2006 to Sion. On 21 July 2009 the 24-year-old forward has left FC Sion to sign a three-year deal with Vannes OC.

Honours
Swiss Cup: 2008–09

References

External links
 
 
 Virgile Reset at Weltfussball.de  
 FC Sion profile 

1985 births
Living people
People from Les Lilas
French footballers
FC Lorient players
FC Sion players
Swiss Super League players
Vannes OC players
US Boulogne players
CS Sedan Ardennes players
ÉFC Fréjus Saint-Raphaël players
SC Toulon players
Ligue 2 players
Championnat National players
French expatriate footballers
Expatriate footballers in Switzerland
Association football midfielders
Footballers from Seine-Saint-Denis